The following is a bibliography of Alberta history.

Surveys and reference
 , a short encyclopedia
  a very good starting point 
  scholarly biographies of every important person who died by 1930
 
 
 
  primary sources
 , standard survey by leading historian
 
 
 , a comparison with Saskatchewan, Fulltext in EBSCO
   14 popular essays on the fur trade, aboriginal peoples, exploration, the North-West Mounted Police, ranchers, homesteaders, territorial and provincial politics, women, and Albertan culture.

Economics, business, labour
 
  1919 primary source
 
  primary sources
 Online
  A primary source; interviews with oil workers
  Author's discussion
 
 
 Hayward, Anne. Alberta pottery industry, 1912-1990: A social and economic history (University of Ottawa Press, 2001).
 
 
 
 
 
   influential Marxist interpretation
 
 
 Thompson, John Herd, and Allen Seager. "Workers, Growers and Monopolists: The" Labour Problem" in the Alberta Beet Sugar Industry During the 1930s." Labour/Le Travail (1978): 153-174. online

Medical
 Boschma, Geertje. "Community mental health nursing in Alberta, Canada: An oral history." Nursing History Review 20.1 (2012): 103-135.
 Boschma, Geertje. "Deinstitutionalization reconsidered: geographic and demographic changes in mental health care in British Columbia and Alberta, 1950-1980." Histoire sociale/Social history 44.2 (2011): 223-256 online.
 Boschma, Geertje. "“You Had To Just Kind Of Rub Her Cheek”: Memories and Emotions of Mental Deficiency Nurses in Alberta, Canada, 1945-1975." Quality Advancement in Nursing Education-Avancées en formation infirmière 6.2 (2020): 5+. online
 Burnett, Kristin. Taking medicine: women's healing work and colonial contact in southern Alberta, 1880-1930 (UBC Press, 2010).
 Corbet, Elise. Frontiers of Medicine: A History of Medical Education and Research at the University of Alberta (University of Alberta, 1990).
 Smith, Mary, and Nazilla Khanlou. "An Analysis of Canadian psychiatric mental health nursing through the junctures of history, gender, nursing education, and quality of work life in Ontario, Manitoba, Alberta, and Saskatchewan." ISRN nursing 2013 (2013) online.

First Nations, Metis
 
 ; and

High culture

Politics and government
  - Primary Source
 
 
 Boudreau, Joseph A., ed. Alberta, Aberhart and Social Credit. Canadian History Through the Press. Holt, Rinehart and Winston of Canada, 1975. 122 pp. - newspaper reports; primary source
 
 Caldarola, Carlo, ed. Society and Politics in Alberta: Research Papers. Toronto: Methuen, 1979. 392 pp.
 Elliott, David R. and Iris Miller. Bible Bill: A Biography of William Aberhart. Edmonton: Reidmore Books, 1987. 373 pp.
 

 Hesketh, Bob. Major Douglas and Alberta Social Credit. U. of Toronto Press, 1997. 315 pp.
 Hewitt, Steve. Riding to the Rescue: The Transformation of the RCMP in Alberta and Saskatchewan, 1914-1939. (2006). 205 pp. excerpt and text search
 
 Lin, Zhiqiu. Policing the Wild North-West: A Sociological Study of the Provincial Police in Alberta and Saskatchewan, 1905-32 (2007) online
 
 Mardon, Ernest, and Austin Mardon. Alberta Election Results 1882–1992. Edmonton: Documentary Heritage Society of Alberta (1993).
 Monto, Tom. The United Farmers of Alberta: A Movement, A Government (Edmonton: GranhPublishing, 1989)
 
 
 
 Thomas, Lewis H., ed. William Aberhart and Social Credit in Alberta. Toronto: Copp Clark, 1977. 175 pp. readings
 
  - Textbook

Regional, urban, environment
 Belliveau, Anne. The Story of Alberta's Big West Country: Upper North Saskatchewan River Corridor, Shunda Basin, Brazeau Collieries and Nordegg. Calgary: Detselig, 1999. 240 pp.
 
 

 Foran, Max. Calgary: An Illustrated History/Calgary: Histoire Illustrée. Toronto: Lorimer; Ottawa: Natl. Mus. of Man, 1978. 192 pp.
 
 
 MacDonald, Graham A. Where the Mountains Meet the Prairies: A History of Waterton Country. (Parks and Heritage Series, No. 3.) U. of Calgary Press, 2000. 210 pp.
 Melnyk, Bryan P. Calgary Builds: The Emergence of an Urban Landscape, 1905-1914. Calgary: Alberta Culture, Can. Plains Res. Center, 1985. 214 pp.
 
  - impact of oil on Calgary
 
 
 Timoney, Kevin P., and Peter Lee. "Does the Alberta tar sands industry pollute? The scientific evidence." The Open Conservation Biology Journal 3.1 (2009) online.

Settlement, rural, pioneers
 
 Bennett, John W. and Seena B. Kohl. Settling the Canadian-American West, 1890-1915: Pioneer Adaptation and Community Building. An Anthropological History. U. of Nebraska Press, 1995. 311 pp. online
 
 Brado, Edward. Cattle Kingdom: Early Ranching in Alberta. Vancouver: Douglas & McIntyre, 1984. 298 pp.
 
 
 Hurt, Leslie J. The Victoria Settlement, 1862-1922. Occasional Paper, no. 7. Edmonton: Alberta Culture, Hist. Resources Division, 1979. 242 pp.
 
 Jones, David C. Empire of Dust: Settling and Abandoning the Prairie Dry Belt. U. of Nebraska Press, 1987. 330 pp.
 Jones, David C., ed. "We'll All Be Buried Down Here": The Prairie Dryland Disaster, 1917-1926. Calgary: Alberta Records Publ. Board; Hist. Soc. of Alberta, 1986. 200 pp. collects primary sources
  Leonard, David W.  Delayed Frontier: The Peace River Country to 1909.  Calgary, Alta.: Detselig, 1995. 256 pp.
 Palmer, Howard. The Settlement of the West (1977) online edition
 Rennie, Bradford James. The Rise of Agrarian Democracy: The United Farmers and Farm Women of Alberta, 1909-1921. U of Toronto Press, 2000. 282 pp.
 Gross, Renie. Groundwork: Carl Anderson, Farm Crusader. Wardlow, Alta.: Badlands Books, 1998. 352 pp.
 Jackson, Mary Percy. Suitable for the Wilds: Letters from Northern Alberta, 1929-1931. ed. by Janice Dickin McGinnis, Toronto: U. of Toronto Press, 1995. 264 pp.; a primary source
 Sharp, Paul F. Whoop-up Country: The Canadian-American West, 1865-1885. Reprint ed., Norman: U. of Oklahoma Press, 1973. 347pp. primary source
  Silverman, Eliane Leslau. The Last Best West: Women on the Alberta Frontier  1880-1930.  Montreal: Eden, 1984. 183 pp.
 Thompson, John Herd. Forging the Prairie West. (1998)
  Voisey, Paul.  Vulcan: The Making of a Prairie Community.  Toronto: U. of Toronto Press, 1987. 341 pp.

Social, ethnic, religion and schools
  
 Byrne, M. B. From the Buffalo to the Cross: A History of the Roman Catholic Diocese of Calgary. Calgary Archdiocese. 555 pp.
 Cavanaugh, Catherine A. and Warne, Randi R., ed. Standing on New Ground: Women in Alberta. U. of Alberta Press, 1993. 202 pp.
 den Otter, Andy A. Civilizing the West: The Galts and the Development of Western Canada. U. of Alberta Press, 1981. 395 pp.
 Flint, David. The Hutterites: A Study in Prejudice. Oxford U. Press, 1975. 193 pp.
 Gray, James. Booze: The Impact of Whisky On the Prairie West (Toronto: Macmillan, 1972.)
 Hoe, Ban Seng. Structural Changes of Two Chinese Communities in Alberta, Canada. Mercury Series, no. 19. Ottawa: Natl. Mus. of Man, Can. Centre for Folk Culture Studies, 1976. 385 pp.
 McLachlan, Elizabeth. With Unshakeable Persistence: Rural Teachers of the Depression Era. Edmonton: NeWest, 1999. 187 pp.
 Palmer, Howard and Palmer, Tamara, eds. Peoples of Alberta: Portraits of Cultural Diversity. Saskatoon, Sask.: Western Producer Prairie Books, 1985. 551 pp.
 Palmer, Howard. Patterns of Prejudice: A History of Nativism in Alberta. McClelland and Stewart, 1982. 217 pp.
 Scheffel, David. In the Shadow of Antichrist: The Old Believers in Alberta. Peterborough, Ont.: Broadview, 1991. 252 pp.
 Stebbins, Robert A. The Franco-Calgarians: French Language, Leisure, and Linguistic Life-Style in an Anglophone City. U. of Toronto Press, 1994. 152 pp.
  Ukrainian Pioneers' Association of Alberta.  Ukrainians in Alberta.  Edmonton: Ukrainian Pioneers' Assoc. of Alberta  (1975) 560 pp.
 Wall, Karen L. Game Plan: A Social History of Sport in Alberta'' (2013) online review
 Williams, Robert J., Yale D. Belanger, and Jennifer N. Arthur. "Gambling in Alberta: History, current status and socioeconomic impacts" (Alberta Gaming Research Institute, 2011) online.

See also

Bibliography of Canada
Bibliography of Canadian history
Bibliography of Nova Scotia
Bibliography of Saskatchewan history
Bibliography of British Columbia
Bibliography of the 1837-1838 insurrections in Lower Canada
List of books about the War of 1812

 
Alberta History